Tuntsa Wilderness Area is a wilderness reserve in the municipalities of Salla and Savukoski in Lapland, Finland. It was established in 1991 like all the other wilderness areas in Lapland.

See also
 Wilderness areas of Finland

References

Protected areas established in 1991
1991 establishments in Finland
Salla
Wilderness areas of Finland